The Castle of Muiden in Winter is a 1658 oil on canvas painting by Jan Abrahamsz Beerstraaten, now in the National Gallery, London, which bought it in 1890. It shows Muiden Castle near Amsterdam, with several figures ice skating in the foreground.

References

Landscape paintings
Dutch Golden Age paintings
1658 paintings
Collections of the National Gallery, London